Metarctia insignis is a moth of the subfamily Arctiinae. It was described by Sergius G. Kiriakoff in 1959. It is found in Rwanda and Tanzania.

References

 

Metarctia
Moths described in 1959